Eladio Sánchez Prado (born 12 July 1984) is a Spanish former professional road racing cyclist.

Major results
2002
 1st  Junior National Cyclo-cross Championships
2004
 1st  Under–23 National Time Trial Championships
 1st Stage 3 Vuelta a Salamanca
2005
 2nd Road race, Mediterranean Games
2008
 2nd Overall Tour du Loir-et-Cher

References

1984 births
Living people
Spanish male cyclists
People from Castro Urdiales
Mediterranean Games silver medalists for Spain
Mediterranean Games medalists in cycling
Competitors at the 2005 Mediterranean Games
Cyclists from Cantabria